Nick & Perry (also known as Les Marchien) is an animated television series created by Udo Beissel for Cartoon Network. It is about two alien dogs, Nick and Perry, who crash land on Earth and try to blend in with normal dogs, while hiding their alien secret from the people. The series stars Rolf Berg and Daniel Werner as the titular characters, Nick and Perry. The program originally ran from 2000 to 2001, broadcasting 52 episodes over two seasons.

Premise
Nick and Perry, the title characters of the series, are two alien dogs, who crash-landed from their planet Dogmas, to planet Earth. They have to disguise themselves as regular dogs, to prevent their secret from coming out, or else they will be sold to science. Perry and Nick study Earth culture throughout the series, with Perry interested in the functions and workings of Earth culture, and Nick looking at the bright side of things.

Characters
Nick is a tall, orange dog with a proud stature. He is very fascinated in Earth life, especially television, and his love interest, Sofia. He is lazy, loves pleasure, and is very optimistic, not having a bad thought about anyone. Unlike other dogs, he is a vegetarian. He is not too smart compared to his friend, Perry, although the two can work together well.
Perry is a small, blue dog resembling a beagle. He is highly intelligent, and is extraordinarily talented in technology and can build highly complex apparatus out of simple human objects. The easy-going Nick often causes him a lot of trouble, especially when he messes up his return plans. Despite this, they are friends, and they both work well together.
Lucy is a little girl who wanted nothing more than a dog for her birthday. When a UFO crashed overnight in her garden and the normally upright and talking dog manners Nick and Perry had to disguise themselves as earth dogs, she thought they were a gift from her father. Lucy is a very bright, adventurous only child.
Frank is a history professor and a single father. When Lucy thinks the two dog manners are a present from him, he can't bring himself to disappoint her and keeps Nick and Perry. Frank is often a little absent-minded and gullible.
Mr. Smith is Frank and Lucy's spiteful neighbor and a part-time UFO hunter who tries to catch Nick and Perry in non-dog behavior and then sell them to science.

Production
The series was produced in 1998 and 1999 under the direction of Tony Barnes by Ellipse Animation, TFC Trickompany Filmproduktion and Victory 16. Film Production. Danny Chang composed the music.

It was first broadcast on October 25, 2000 by M6 Métropole Télévision in France. In Germany, the series was shown on September 11, 2001 to September 27, 2001 on Ki.Ka.

See also
List of German television series

External links
 

2000s French animated television series
French children's animated comic science fiction television series
German children's animated comedy television series
German children's animated science fiction television series
2000 French television series debuts
2001 German television series debuts
Television series about alien visitations
Animated television series about dogs
Animated television series about extraterrestrial life